Trump House may refer to:

 Trump House, a house in Latrobe, Pennsylvania, used to promote Donald Trump's presidential campaigns
 85-15 Wareham Place, Donald Trump's childhood home in New York City
 Edwin Trump House, a historic house in Fenton, Michigan

See also
 List of things named after Donald Trump